Koutiala (Bambara: ߞߎߕߌߊߟߊ tr. Kutiala) is a city in Mali in the administrative region of Sikasso, and is located 140 km north of the city of Sikasso.  Koutiala serves as the capital of its administrative Cercle, home to 575,253 people in 2009.  As of the 2009 Census, Koutiala has 137,919 residents.

History
Situated in Minianka country, Koutiala was founded in the 16th century by members of the Coulibaly family from the Bambara kingdom of Segou. It now contains an important hospital for women and children.
Koutiala's sister city is Alençon, France.

Economy
Koutiala is the heartland of cotton production in Mali and is sometimes called "the white gold capital" for its cotton. However, the industry has been affected by stagnation since the 1980s. Aside from cotton it is also noted for grain production, primarily pearl millet, sorghum and maize. Koutiala is the second most industrial city in Mali, hosting, among others, the Compagnie malienne pour le développement du textile (CMDT) and the Huilerie cotonnière du Mali (HUICOMA).

Notable people
Ibrahim Boubacar Keïta (1945-2022)

See also 
 List of cities in Mali

References 

Communes of Sikasso Region